In a movie a medium shot, mid shot (MS), or waist shot is a camera angle shot from a medium distance.

Use 
Medium shots are favored in sequences where dialogues or a small group of people are acting, as they give the viewer a partial view of the background, such as when the shot is 'cutting the person in half' and also show the subjects' facial expressions in the context of their body language. Medium shots are also used when the subject in the shot is delivering information, such as news presenters. It is also used in interviews. It is the most common shot in movies, and it usually follows the first establishing shots of a new scene or location. 

A normal lens that sees what the human eye see, is usually used for medium shots.

Definition 

The medium shot shows equality between subjects and background. The dividing line between what constitutes a long shot and medium shot is not definite, nor is the line between medium shot and close-up. In some standard texts and professional references, a full-length view of a human subject is called a medium shot; in this terminology, a shot of the person from the knees up or the waist up is a close-up shot. In other texts, these partial views are called medium shots. In principal, the medium shot is what can be seen with the human eye in a single quick glance and convey all the action taking place in that field of view.

Types 
Medium shots are divided into singles (a waist-high shot of one actor), group shots, over-the shoulders or two-shots (featuring two people). A medium wide shot, or American shot, shows a bit more of the background but is still close enough for facial expressions to be seen, although these facial expressions would be better seen in a waist-high shot.

See also 

 Camera angle
 Camera operator
 Close-up
 Dutch angle
 Establishing shot
 High-angle shot
 Long shot
 Low-angle shot
 Mise-en-scène
 Over the shoulder shot
 Two shot
 Video production
 Videographer

References

Further reading 

Cinematic techniques
Television terminology